Bhumiraj Rai (born 22 June 1989) is a Nepalese long-distance runner. In 2017, he competed in the men's marathon at the 2017 World Championships in Athletics held in London, United Kingdom. He did not finish his race.

References

External links 
 

Living people
1989 births
Place of birth missing (living people)
Nepalese male long-distance runners
Nepalese male marathon runners
World Athletics Championships athletes for Nepal
21st-century Nepalese people